Johann von Salis-Seewis (8 December 1862 – 24 October 1940) also known as Johann Ulrich Graf von Salis-Seewis was an Austro-Hungarian military officer during World War I. An ethnic Croat, Salis-Seewis commanded the Croatian 42nd Honvéd Infantry Division (nicknamed the Devil's Division)  first as part of the unsuccessful Serbian Campaign of 1914 and then on the Carpathian Front. On his return, he became military commander of Vienna before serving as the first military governor of the Military General Governorate of Serbia during the Austro-Hungarian occupation. He later commanded the 92nd Landwehr Infantry Division during the Romanian campaign and headed the Supreme Command in occupied Romania. After the dissolution of the Austro–Hungarian monarchy, following its defeat in the war, Salis-Seewis settled in Croatia where he got involved with the Croatian fascist Ustaše.

Early life
Johann Ulrich Salis-Seewis was born in Karlovac, Croatia-Slavonia in the Austro-Hungarian Empire, on 8 December 1862. He was the third child of Gaudenz Gubert Comte Salis-Seewis (1824–1873) from an old Swiss aristocracy (the Salis-Seewis family was granted an earldom by King Louis XIV of France) and his wife Wilhelmina ( Dobrinović) from an old Croatian noble family originally from Bosnia. His great-grandfather was Swiss poet Johann Gaudenz von Salis-Seewis. Johann Ulrich's father died in 1873 when he was eleven.

After attending military school Salis-Seewis was sent as a military advisor in Skopje at a time of unrest in the region of Macedonia between insurgents (Bulgarian, Greek, Macedonian, Montenegrin and Serbian population) and the occupying Turkish army. Salis-Seewis was made commander of the Turkish gendarmerie, he occupied the position from 1903 to 1905. After returning from the mission, he served in the 86th Infantry Regiment in Budapest before joining the 76th Infantry Regiment in Esztergom, from 1908 to 1911 he was appointed commander of the 79th Infantry Regiment. In 1911 he was based in Rijeka commanding the 71st Infantry Brigade. He was promoted to major general on 9 May 1912.

World War I
During the first unsuccessful Serbian Campaign he was given command of the 71st Infantry Brigade. After the failure of the campaign and the retreat of Austro-Hungarian forces out of Serbia, Salis-Seewis was redeployed with the 42nd division to Galicia and the Carpathian Front, he received the rank of Lieutenant Field Marshal in February 1915. He stayed in command until 22 June 1915 when he was relieved of his command by General Karl von Pflanzer-Baltin who was dissatisfied with his leadership. In November 1915, he was appointed commander of the garrison in Vienna.

On 7 January 1916, following the conquest of Serbia by the Central Powers, he was appointed by Emperor Franz Joseph I, military governor of the Military General Governorate of Serbia, in that function he was supported by Chief of Staff, Lieutenant Colonel Otto Gellinek. Following suspicions then complaints from the Hungarian authorities that Salis-Seewis supported the annexation idea of incorporating Serbia into the Empire, he was dismissed of his function in July 1916 and replaced by his former corps commander,  General der Infanterie Adolf von Rhemen. He was reassigned commander of the 92nd Infantry Division in Moldavia during the Romanian campaign, then appointed commander of the so-called corps.  (Supreme Command of the Armed Forces of Romania) under General August von Mackensen, the German military governor of occupied Roumania.

Post-war period and death
On 11 November 1918 as the war came to an end he was promoted to Feldzeugmeister. Following the defeat of Austria-Hungary and the Central Powers, he moved to Croatia where the government of the new Kingdom of the Serbs, Croats, and Slovenes allowed him to settle and gave him a state pension. He later joined the ranks of the fascist Croat nationalist Ustaše movement. He died on 24 October 1940 in Zagreb.

See also
Johann Gaudenz von Salis-Seewis
Royal Croatian Home Guard
Military General Governorate of Serbia

Notes

References

Citations

Sources
 
 
 
 
 
 
 
 

1862 births
1940 deaths
Austro-Hungarian military personnel of World War I
Austro-Hungarian people
Austro-Hungarian generals
People from Karlovac
Croatian military personnel in Austrian armies
Croatian people of World War I
Croatian Austro-Hungarians
Austro-Hungarian Army officers
Royal Croatian Home Guard
Ustaše
Austro-Hungarian occupation of Serbia during World War I